Cape Jaffa is a locality in the Australian state of South Australia located on the headland of Cape Jaffa on the state's south east coastline overlooking the body of water known in Australia as the Southern Ocean and by international authorities as the Great Australian Bight.

The locality includes a settlement located on the north side of the headland overlooking Lacepede Bay which is also known as Cape Jaffa.  The settlement includes a jetty and a marina.  The locality includes part of the Bernouilli Conservation Reserve. The Marina (known as Cape Jaffa Anchorage) received development approval in January 2006. The plans allow for several stages of development. At least the first stage exists, and the marina is considered to still be "under construction" in 2018.

The 2016 Australian census which was conducted in August 2016 reports that Cape Jaffa had a population of 54 people.

Cape Jaffa is located within the federal division of Barker, the state MacKillop and the local government area of the Kingston District Council.

Gallery

References

J
J